The Sulafa Tower is a 76-story skyscraper in the Dubai Marina in Dubai, United Arab Emirates. The tower has a total structural height of 288 m (945 ft), making it the 25th tallest building in Dubai and 172nd tallest in the world. Construction of the Sulafa Tower by Turkish conglomerate TAV Construction was completed in 2010.

On the afternoon of 20 July 2016, a fire erupted in the tower. No casualties were recorded. Many people in this tower were allowed to seek refuge in a nearby hotel tower. This is the second fire in a skyscraper in Dubai.

Gallery

See also 
 List of tallest buildings in Dubai
 List of tallest buildings in the United Arab Emirates

References

External links

TAV Website
Emporis

Residential skyscrapers in Dubai